Sar Bagh (also Romanized as Sar Bāgh, Sar-e Bāgh, and Sarabagh) is a village in Hotkan Rural District, in the Central District of Zarand County, Kerman Province, Iran. At the 2006 census, its population was 57, in 12 families.

References 

Populated places in Zarand County